William Angus (–12 October 1821) was an English engraver of copper plates for prints and book illustrations.

Life and work

William Angus was born in 1752. He became a master engraver. Among his pupils was the engraver William Bernard Cooke (1778–1855).

He died in Islington, Middlesex on 12 October 1821; probate was granted on his will on 15 March 1822.

Works

 Brough Hall, seat of Sir John Lawson
 Castle Howard
 Cusworth, seat of William Wrightson
 Sand Beck, seat of the Earl of Scarborough
 Thomas Paine, 1791
 Newnham Court in Oxfordshire, the Seat of Earl Harecourt, 1795

References

1752 births
1821 deaths
English engravers